Vae Solis is the debut album by Scorn, originally released in 1992 on Earache in the UK, and Relativity in the United States. It features the same musician lineup as Side A of Napalm Death's Scum.

It has been said that the cover features a collage of two medical photographs superimposed. One photo is an open throat, probably diseased, while the other is a cancerous cell, taken with microscope.

The album is often associated with industrial and experimental music.

Track listing

With the following extras on the CD version
"Scum After Death (dub)" – 5:54
"Fleshpile (edit)" – 5:15
"Orgy of Holiness" – 4:48
"Still Life" – 4:13

Personnel

Scorn
Nicholas Bullen – vocals, bass guitar, sampler, production, artwork
Mick Harris – drums, sampler, vocals, production

Additional musicians and production
Justin Broadrick – guitar
Paul Johnston – engineering
Luton Sinfield – photography
Antz White – artwork

References

1992 debut albums
Earache Records albums
Music in Birmingham, West Midlands
Relativity Records albums
Scorn (band) albums
Albums produced by Nicholas Bullen
Albums produced by Mick Harris